John Wilson (6 August 1741, Applethwaite, Westmorland – 18 October 1793, Kendal, Westmorland) was an English mathematician and judge.  Wilson's theorem is named after him.

Wilson attended school in Staveley, Cumbria before going up to Peterhouse, Cambridge in 1757, where he was a student of  Edward Waring.  He was Senior Wrangler in 1761. He was later knighted, and became a Fellow of the Royal Society in 1782.  He was Judge of Common Pleas from 1786 until his death in 1793.

See also
Wilson prime

Notes

References
 C. M. Neale (1907) The Senior Wranglers of the University of Cambridge.  Available online
 Robinson, Derek John Scott. An introduction to abstract algebra. 2003. Walter de Gruyter. 

1741 births
1793 deaths
18th-century English mathematicians
Number theorists
Fellows of the Royal Society
Alumni of Peterhouse, Cambridge
Justices of the Common Pleas
Senior Wranglers
People from Cumberland
People from Westmorland